Sutemos was an electronic record label based in Lithuania. It was founded in January 2004, as an online record label. So far it has released music from revered electronica artists such as Ulrich Schnauss, Manual, IJO, Sleepy Town Manufacture, Stockfinster and 3tronik. Perhaps the most well-known releases from Sutemos have been the Intelligent Toys series. As of July 2012 the Sutemos website is down and reclaimed by a domain parking agency.

See also
 List of record labels

References

External links
 Playground for Electronic Music Interview with Sutemos Netlabel on Phlow-Magazine.com on 14.01.2009

Lithuanian record labels
Record labels established in 2004
Electronic music record labels